The Census at Bethlehem (also known as The Numbering at Bethlehem) is an oil-on-panel by the Flemish Renaissance artist Pieter Bruegel the Elder, painted in 1566.  It is signed and measures about 1155 × 1645 mm.  It is currently held and exhibited at the Royal Museums of Fine Arts of Belgium in Brussels, which acquired it in 1902.  It is one of the first paintings in Western art to feature a significant snow landscape and was painted in the aftermath of the winter of 1565, which was one of the harshest winters on record.

Description

The painting shows Bethlehem as a Flemish village in winter at sundown.  A group of people is gathered at a building on the left, having their details taken down by a scribe. A sign bearing the Habsburg double-headed eagle is visible on the building.  Other people are making their way to the same building, including the figures of Joseph and the pregnant Virgin Mary on a donkey. A pig is being slaughtered, though of course such an event would never have occurred in Jewish Bethlehem. People are going about their daily business in the cold, children are shown playing with toys on the ice and having snowball fights.  At the very centre of the painting is a spoked wheel, sometimes interpreted as being a reference to the wheel of fortune.  To the right, a man in a small hut is shown holding a clapper, a warning to keep away from leprosy. Leprosy was endemic in that part of Europe when the painting was created. There is a begging bowl in front of the hut.  In the background, men drink at a makeshift bar, and in the distance are a well-kept church and a crumbling castle.

As he often did, Bruegel treats a biblical story, here the census of Quirinius, as a contemporary event. And once again, reference to particular political events has been adduced - in this case, the severity of the Spanish administration in the southern Netherlands. However, Bruegel may well be making a more general criticism of bureaucratic methods.

The events depicted are described in Luke 2, 1-5: 

This is a rare subject in previous Netherlandish art. The ruined castle in the background, at the painting's top right, is based on the towers and gates of Amsterdam.

Copies
Pieter Brueghel the Younger and his studio made dozens of copies of the painting after his father's death, one of which was sold at auction for $10 million in 2013. Another copy, dated from 1610, is also at  Royal Museums of Fine Arts of Belgium in Brussels.

Notes

Further reading
 (see index)

External links

 The Census at the Royal Museums of Fine Arts of Belgium 

Paintings by Pieter Bruegel the Elder
1566 paintings
Collections of the Royal Museums of Fine Arts of Belgium
Paintings of the Virgin Mary
Paintings of Saint Joseph
Birds in art
Donkeys in art
Census of Quirinius